A bagel and cream cheese (also known as bagel with cream cheese) is a common  food pairing in American cuisine, the cuisine of New York City, and American Jewish cuisine. It consists, in its basic form, of a sliced bagel spread with cream cheese. The bagel with cream cheese is traditionally and most commonly served open-faced, sliced horizontally and spread with cream cheese and other toppings. Beginning in the 1980s as bagels greatly expanded in popularity beyond Jewish communities, the bagel served closed as a sandwich became increasingly popular for its portability. The basic bagel with cream cheese serves as the base for other items such as the "lox and schmear", a staple of delicatessens in the New York City area and across the U.S. While non-Jewish ingredients take well to bagel sandwiches, such as eggs and breakfast meats, cold cuts and sliced cheese, several traditional Jewish toppings for bagels do not work well between bagel halves, including the popular whitefish salad, pickled herring or chopped liver for the simple mechanical reason that soft toppings easily squirt out the sides when the bagel is bitten, as even a fresh bagel is firmer than most breads.

American cuisine

A bagel with cream cheese is common in American cuisine, particularly in New York City. It is often eaten for breakfast; with smoked salmon added, it is sometimes served for brunch. In New York City circa 1900, a popular combination consisted of a bagel topped with lox, cream cheese, capers, tomato, and red onion.

The combination of a bagel with cream cheese has been promoted to American consumers in the past by American food manufacturers and publishers. In the early 1950s, Kraft Foods launched an "aggressive advertising campaign" that depicted Philadelphia-brand cream cheese with bagels. In 1977, Better Homes and Family Circle magazines published a bagel and cream cheese recipe booklet that was distributed in the magazines and also placed in supermarket dairy cases.

American Jewish cuisine

In American Jewish cuisine, a bagel and cream cheese is sometimes called a "whole schmear" or "whole schmeer". A "slab" is a bagel with a slab of cream cheese on top.  A "lox and a schmear" is to a bagel with cream cheese and lox or “Nova” smoked salmon. The latter being the particular style of Atlantic salmon used by Jewish delis on the East coast, and often also referred to as lox, especially outside the old and shrinking Jewish lineage of delis, Tomato, red onion, capers and chopped hard-boiled egg are often added. These terms are used at some delicatessens in New York City, particularly at Jewish delicatessens and older, more traditional delicatessens.

The lox and schmear likely originated in New York City and Philadelphia, both sites of significant Polish immigration, around the time of the turn of the 20th century, when street vendors in the cities sold salt-cured belly lox from pushcarts. A high amount of salt in the fish necessitated the addition of bread and cheese to offset the lox's saltiness. It was reported by U.S. newspapers in the early 1940s that bagels and lox were sold by delicatessens in New York City as a "Sunday morning treat", and in the early 1950s, bagels and cream cheese combination were very popular in the United States, having permeated American culture.

Mass production
Both bagels and cream cheese are mass-produced foods in the United States. Additionally, in January 2003, Kraft Foods began purveying a mass-produced convenience food product named Philadelphia To Go Bagel & Cream Cheese, which consisted of a combined package of two bagels and cream cheese.

In popular culture
Bagels and cream cheese were provided to theater patrons by the cast of Bagels and Yox, a 1951 American-Yiddish Broadway revue, during the intermission period of the show. The revue ran at the Holiday Theatre in New York City from September 1951 to February 1952. A 1951 review of Bagels and Yox published in Time magazine helped to popularize bagels to American consumers throughout the country.

"Bagel and Lox" is a humorous song about the virtues of the bagel, lox, and cream cheese sandwich. It was written by Sid Tepper and Roy C. Bennett. It has been recorded by several different artists, including Eddie "Rochester" Anderson and, more recently, Rob Schneider, Joan Jaffe, and Oleg Frish. The lyrics to the chorus are:
Bagel and lox with the cheese in the middle,
Bagel and lox let it toast on the griddle, 
Bagel and lox with the cheese in the middle,
And a slice of onion on the side.

See also

 Appetizing store
 Bagel toast
 Cheese and crackers
 Cheese on toast
 Welsh rarebit
 List of bread dishes
 List of cheese dishes
 Pizza bagel

Notes

References

Further reading

External links
 Bagelnomics: The Curious Pricing of New York's Bagel With Cream Cheese. Serious Eats.

Bagels
Cheese dishes
Food combinations
Sandwiches
Cuisine of New York City
Jewish American cuisine